Lanard "D.C. Scorpio" Thompson (also credited as "DC Scorpio") is a Washington, D.C.-based hip-hop recording artist. He is best known for the singles "Stone Cold Hustler", "Beam Me Up, Scotty", and "Stone Cold Hustler II". D.C. Scorpio is considered to be a pioneer in the D.C. hip-hop scene, and is known for infusing go-go music and culture into his songs. He also starred in the 1998 independent film Streetwise.

Discography

Singles
"Stone Cold Hustler" – (Kolossal, 1987)
"Beam Me Up, Scotty" – (I Hear Ya!, 1988)
"Stone Cold Hustler II" – (Washington Hit Makers, 1990)
"How You Like Your Rhymes to Be" – (Creative Funk, 1990)

Other related albums
Go Go Live at the Capital Centre – (I Hear Ya!, 1987)
The Go Go Posse – (I Hear Ya!, 1988)

See also
Hip hop in Washington, D.C.

References

External links
D.C. Scorpio interview with "TMoTTRadio.com"

African-American male actors
American male actors
African-American male rappers
American male rappers
Southern hip hop musicians
Go-go musicians
Living people
Music of Washington, D.C.
Rappers from Washington, D.C.
21st-century American rappers
21st-century American male musicians
Year of birth missing (living people)
21st-century African-American musicians